Ethan Allen is a marble sculpture of Ethan Allen by Larkin Goldsmith Mead.

Vermont State House

A statue of Allen with a different design by Mead formerly stood outside the Vermont State House in Montpelier. Dedicated on October 10, 1861, it deteriorated and was later destroyed.

National Statuary Hall Collection
Another statue of Meade by Allen is in the United States Capitol as part of the National Statuary Hall Collection. This statue was gifted by the state of Vermont in 1876.

Ticonderoga Museum, Ticonderoga, New York

Another carving of the statue is located in the Ticonderoga Museum in Ticonderoga, New York. "The sculpture was previously in the collection of the Ohio County Library in West Virginia, where it had been donated by a local family. The Museum purchased it in 1973 or 1975. It was located outdoors and was moved inside because of deterioration."

In popular culture
A photograph of the statue is featured on the cover and spine of Willard Sterne Randall's biography of Ethan Allen.

References

External links

 

American Revolutionary War monuments and memorials
Ethan Allen
Marble sculptures in Washington, D.C.
Monuments and memorials in Vermont
Monuments and memorials in Washington, D.C.
Allen, Ethan
Outdoor sculptures in Vermont
Sculptures of men in Vermont
Sculptures of men in Washington, D.C.
Statues in Vermont